Zakaria Street is a street that joins Rabindra Sarani with Chittaranjan Avenue (Central Avenue) in Central Kolkata. Nakhoda Mosque is situated in this street. It is the biggest ramadan market in Kolkata. Mohammad Ali Park is located very close to this street. This street is very popular to food bloggers.

History
During the colonial period, the British authority divided the city of Kolkata into two parts. There was a part of the British whose name was White Town. Zakaria Street was then part of Black Town. Zakaria Street was developed as a residential area in the past.  In the nineteenth century, Haji Nur Muhammad Zakaria, a Muslim businessman from the Kutchi Memon community, lived on Armanitola Street. This street is named after him. Later, especially after the riots of 1910, some Muslim families left the area. In 1911, as part of the development work of Calcutta Improvement Trust on the street, it demolished several slums owned by some Muslims, leading to frequent inter-communal territorial fights between the prosperous Marwaris and working class Muslims of this area. Then several Marwari families started to dominate in this area. Frequent riots drove many Marwaris away from the street in the 1950s.

Food street
There are about 100 temporary stalls on this street during the month of Ramadan. There are also at least thirty restaurants open throughout the year. A variety of food is sold in front of the Nakhoda Mosque on the street. This place is usually famous for sahri and iftar food during Ramadan season. A variety of kebabs are available on this street. Haleem is available at Sufia and Aminia Restaurant on Zakaria Street. Chicken Changeji, a North Indian dish, is sold on many more restaurants, including Dilli 6 on this street. Halwa and Lachcha Sewai are also available here. Royal India Hotel sells mutton chap and biryani here. This street is popular for Bakarkhani.

References

External link
 

Ramadan
Streets in Kolkata
Tourist attractions in Kolkata
Restaurant districts and streets in India